Doctor Savithri is a 1955 Indian Tamil-language thriller film directed by R. M. Krishnaswamy and written by Acharya. A contemporary adaptation of the Hindu story of Savitri and Satyavan, the film stars Anjali Devi, S. Balachander, M. N. Nambiar and B. R. Panthulu. It revolves around the title character's (Anjali Devi) efforts to clear the name of her wrongfully convicted husband (Panthulu). The film was released on 25 November 1955 and became a success.

Plot 

Savithri is a doctor who treats the poor for free. When she discovers that Vanaja, a young wealthy woman in their community is being harassed by Nagalingam, a crooked lawyer, she and her husband Somasundaram endeavour to help Vanaja. Later, Nagalingam is murdered by an unknown assailant and Somasundaram is wrongfully convicted of the crime. Savithri investigates the murder and identifies the true killer as Jagath Singh, a doctor who had been blackmailed by Nagalingam.

Cast 

Female cast
 Anjali Devi as Doctor Savithri
 T. A. Mathuram as Aandal
 M. N. Rajam as Vanaja
 Chellam as the lawyer's wife
 (Baby) Kanchana as Vimala

Male cast
 S. Balachander Doctor Jagath Singh
 M. N. Nambiar as Krishnamoorthi
 B. R. Panthulu as Somasundaram
 D. Balasubramaniam as Lawyer Nagalingam
 Serukalathur Sama as Sambandam Pillai
 N. S. Krishnan as Muniyan
 S. D. R. Chandran as Judge
 G. V. Sharma as Public Prosecutor
 Ramaraj as Defense Lawyer
 Ashokan as Commissioner
 C. P. Kittan as Monkey Performer
 Sethuraman as Paranoid and Greedy Person
 Sobharaj as Inspector
 A. Karunanidhi as Guest artist

Dance
 Sayee, Subbulakshmi

Production 
In 1941, a Tamil language film based on the Hindu story of Savitri and Satyavan, titled Savithri was released. More than a decade later, T. G. Raghavachari (Acharya) sought to create a new adaptation of the story but with a modern setting. Titled Doctor Savithri, the film's story and screenplay was written by Acharya and it was directed by R. M. Krishnaswamy and produced by M. Radhakrishnan under the banner Aruna Films. Krishnaswamy also served as the cinematographer, while Raghavan was the art director, and R. M. Venugopal was the editor. Acharya wrote the dialogues, along with A. K. Velan and Elangovan. Roy Chowdary, Muthuswamy Pillai (Sayee Subbulakshmi) and Gopalakrishnan were in charge of the choreography. The film was processed at AVM Studios.

Soundtrack 
Music was composed by G. Ramanathan and lyrics by Udumalai Narayana Kavi, A. Maruthakasi and Mayavaram Vethanayagam Pillai.

Release and reception 
Doctor Savithri was released on 25 November 1955, delayed from Diwali. On the same day The Indian Express wrote, "The atmosphere of mystery and suspense is well maintained to the last though the all-too-brief finale is a bit all-too-tame". The film emerged a commercial success; this assisted in establishing Aruna Films as a leading production company in the 1950s Tamil film industry.

References

External links 
 

1950s Tamil-language films
1950s thriller films
1955 films
Films about miscarriage of justice
Films about Savitri and Satyavan
Films set in 1955
Indian black-and-white films
Indian legal films
Indian thriller films
Legal thriller films